The Association Computability in Europe (ACiE) is an international organization of mathematicians, logicians, computer scientists, philosophers, theoretical physicists and others interested in new developments in computability and in their underlying significance for the real world.  CiE aims to widen understanding and appreciation of the importance of the concepts and techniques of computability theory, and to support the development of a vibrant multi-disciplinary community of researchers focused on computability-related topics. The ACiE positions itself at the interface between applied and fundamental research, prioritising mathematical approaches to computational barriers.

The Association Computability in Europe originated as a research network called Computability in Europe (CiE) in 2003, became a conference series in 2005, and the ACiE was formed in 2008.

Association 

The Association Computability in Europe was founded in Athens, Greece in 2008. Its founding president (2008 to 2015) was Professor S. Barry Cooper; its current president is Elvira Mayordomo and its current secretary general is Giuseppe Primiero.
The Association is promoting the development, particularly in Europe, of computability-related science, ranging over mathematics, computer science, and applications in various natural and engineering sciences such as physics and biology. This also includes the promotion of the study of philosophy and history of computing as it relates to questions of computability. The ACiE is an international member of the Division for Logic, Methodology and Philosophy of Science and Technology of the International Union of History and Philosophy of Science (DLMPST/IUHPST).

Past and Present Presidents

Current Members of the Association Council 

The current member of the Council of the Association are
Marcella Anselmo,
Arnold Beckmann,
Paola Bonizzoni (Past President),
Olivier Bournez,
Merlin Carl,
Liesbeth De Mol (Member-at-Large Executive Committee),
Gianluca Della Vedova,
Johanna Franklin,
Lorenzo Galeotti,
Daniel Graça,
Jarkko Kari,
Benedikt Löwe,
Johann Makowsky,
Florin Manea (Chair of the Conference Series Steering Committee),
Barnaby Martin (Member-at-Large Executive Committee),
Elvira Mayordomo (President),
Dag Normann (Treasurer and Past President),
Arno Pauly,
Alison Pease,
Giuseppe Primiero (Secretary General), 
Mariya Soskova (Member-at-Large Executive Committee),
and Martin Ziegler.

Special Interest Groups 

The Association has three Special Interest Groups (SIGs): 
Women in Computability (WiC),
Transfinite Computations (TraC), and
History and Philosophy of Computing (HaPoC). SIGWiC has been organising the workshop Women in Computability at the CiE conferences since 2007;
HaPoC is also organising two separate conference series: History and Philosophy of Computing and History and Philosophy of Programming.

S. Barry Cooper Prize 

In memory of the visionary engagement of its founding president, the association established the S. Barry Cooper Prize honouring a researcher who has contributed to a broad understanding and foundational study of computability by outstanding results, by seminal and lasting theory building, by exceptional service to the research communities involved, or by a combination of these.
The inaugural S. Barry Cooper Prize was awarded in 2020 to Bruno Courcelle.

Conference series 

The Association grew out of the major international conference series Computability in Europe (CiE);
the first CiE conference was held in Amsterdam in June 2005. CiE is an interdisciplinary annual conference series promoting the development of computability-related science, ranging over mathematics, computer science, and applications in various natural and engineering sciences such as physics and biology. The conference scope also includes the study of philosophy and history of computing as it relates to questions of computability.

 CiE 2005: New Computational Paradigms, Amsterdam, The Netherlands
 CiE 2006: Logical approaches to computational barriers, Swansea, Wales
 CiE 2007: Computation and Logic in the Real World, Siena, Italy
 CiE 2008: Logic and Theory of Algorithms, Athens, Greece
 CiE 2009: Mathematical Theory and Computational Practice, Heidelberg, Germany
 CiE 2010: Programs, Proofs, Processes, Ponta Delgada (Azores), Portugal
 CiE 2011: Models of Computation in Context, Sofia, Bulgaria
 CiE 2012: How the World Computes, Cambridge, England
 CiE 2013: The Nature of Computation: Logic, Algorithms, Applications, Milan, Italy
 CiE 2014: Language, Life, Limits, Budapest, Hungary
 CiE 2015: Evolving Computability, Bucharest, Romania
 CiE 2016: Pursuit of the Universal, Paris, France
 CiE 2017: Unveiling Dynamics and Complexity, Turku, Finland
 CiE 2018: Sailing Routes in the World of Computation, Kiel, Germany
 CiE 2019: Computing with Foresight and Industry , Durham, England.
 CiE 2020: Beyond the Horizon of Computability, Salerno, Italy (held as a fully online conference).
 CiE 2021: Connecting with Computability, Gent, Belgium (online).
 CiE 2022: Revolutions and Revelations in Computability, Swansea, Wales.
 CiE 2023: Unity of Logic and Computation, Batumi, Georgia.

The current chair of the Steering Committee of the conference series is Florin Manea; his predecessors were Benedikt Löwe (2005–2013) and Arnold Beckmann (2013–2016).

Book series and journal 

The ACiE has editorial responsibility for the Springer book series Theory and Applications of Computability
and the journal Computability published by IOS Press.

References

Theoretical computer science
Mathematics organizations
Mathematical logic organizations
Computer science organizations
Information technology organizations based in Europe